Gay cruising describes the act of searching about a public place in pursuit of a partner for sex. The activity has existed in England and Wales since at least the 17th century and has a colourful legal history. It differs from prostitution in that the parties involved do not seek money for sex, and from gay nightclubs or bathhouses in that they are not on private premises, although they may take place on private land to which the public have been granted access.

History and origins 
The history of gay cruising is sparsely documented, as the illegality of gay sex meant that those who used such cruising grounds were likely to be discreet about them. Rictor Norton, author of Mother Clap's Molly House (a reference to Margaret Clap), is one of the few historians to address the topic. He believes that the first gay cruising grounds and gay brothels in London may have sprung up in the early 17th century; theatres were sometimes denounced as such by moralists of the time.

So-called "cruising grounds" or "cruising sites", where gay and bisexual men meet at a public place to cruise for sex, originated in the late 1600s (from the earliest known records, although it most likely originated much earlier) and has continued to the present day. Cruising came about owing to the illegality of homosexual acts in the United Kingdom. Prior to the Sexual Offences Act 1967, this illegality meant that many gay men could not live openly as homosexuals. Cruising provided a way for gay men to solicit sexual encounters while minimizing the risk of being caught by the police. When cruising first became known, it usually took place in public fields, parks, toilets (or "cottages" as they would become known as in the 20th century). In more recent times, public lay-bys located either on or off main roads or rural roads have also become popular sites.
Gay beat is an Australian term.

Legal history 
Before the 20th century, anal sex, whether conducted in public or private, was illegal under sodomy laws, including the Buggery Act set down by Henry VIII in 1533. The penalty for anal intercourse during most of this period was death; however, specific proof of successful anal penetration was required for this verdict to be brought. The lesser crime of "gross indecency" carried penalties including the pillory (as in the case of the Vere Street Coterie, who were arrested in a raid of a gay club in 1811), transportation and imprisonment.

The death penalty for anal sex was lifted in 1861. An 1885 law prohibited "gross indecency", which included all erotic conduct between men. Eventually, in 1967, some of the Wolfenden Report's recommendations of a decade earlier led to the decriminalisation of homosexual sex in private; no such legal privilege pertains to sex in public places, either for homosexual or heterosexual sex. Therefore, despite more tolerance in the law and society at large, gay men have continued to be at risk of prosecution for public sex.

A number of well known people have been arrested for sex in public places in England and Wales, including:
 Simeon Solomon, a painter who was arrested in a London toilet in 1873 with a 60-year-old stableman. He was also later arrested in France for a similar offence.
 Tom Driberg, later an MP, who was charged with indecent assault after two men shared his bed in the 1940s. He later used his position as a journalist several times to get off charges when caught soliciting in public toilets by the police.
 Actor Wilfrid Brambell, known for appearing in Steptoe and Son, was arrested in a toilet in Shepherd's Bush on 6 November 1962.
 Peter Dudley, an actor in Coronation Street who played Ivy Tilsley's husband, was arrested in 1981 in a toilet in Didsbury, Manchester.
 Actor John Gielgud was arrested for "importuning" in 1953 in Chelsea, London.
 William J. Field, (Member of Parliament), was arrested for persistently importuning in a public toilet in 1953. Field appealed against the conviction twice but failed on both occasions.
 Record producer Joe Meek, arrested in a toilet in Islington in 1963.
 Michael Turnbull was arrested in Hull for cottaging in a public toilet in 1968, before he became Bishop of Durham.
 Actor Peter Wyngarde, arrested (under his real name, Cyril Louis Goldbert) in Gloucester bus station public toilets in September 1975 for gross indecency with Richard Jack Whalley. He was fined £75.
 Stedman Pearson of the pop group Five Star, arrested in a toilet in New Malden in 1990.

The playwright Joe Orton wrote in his posthumously published diaries of his regular cottaging, but he did not incur prosecution.

Areas with a history of gay cruising
 lists a number of London cruising grounds during the Georgian era. These included St. James's Park, Moorfields, the public privies at Lincoln's Inn, and Smithfield prior to the Gordon Riots.

Hampstead Heath in north London has a long history of gay cruising, which was accompanied by police arrests and attacks. From the late 1990s, this evolved into minimal active policing, and support from gay sexual health organisations. During an interview on BBC News 24, the singer George Michael, who was allegedly caught cruising on Hampstead Heath by News of the World photographers, claimed that his cruising was de facto private because it occurred at 2am. In 1992, Conservative MP Alan Amos resigned his parliamentary seat after he was found by the police "engaging in a homosexual act" on the Heath.

Clapham Common in south London is well known for gay cruising. The Labour MP Ron Davies resigned from the government after national newspapers reported that he was attacked and robbed by a man whom he met on the Common. A number of homophobic attacks have occurred around the area, including the murder of Jody Dobrowski. The gay-themed TV drama Clapham Junction was based around the lives of gay men in the area and included scenes of cruising and cottaging.

Current situation 
The Sexual Offences Act 2003 prohibits all forms of sexual activity in a public lavatory, but has nothing to say about other forms of cruising. However, persons of any gender who engage in sexual intercourse in public can find themselves charged with offences under the Public Order Act 1986, if the police have sufficient evidence to convince a court of law that the activity was witnessed by a third party, or there was a high likelihood of the activity being witnessed by a third party.

Presently, there is an active population of men who visit cruising grounds, which include parks, picnic areas and lay-bys where sex takes place in the bushes or other sheltered areas. These areas exist in all parts of Britain, including isolated rural areas. The attitude of the police to cruising at any given location varies, according to the time of the day or night, and the level of public concern measured by the number of complaints from local residents and councillors. Occasionally, police community support officers will visit a cruising area during the early hours of the morning with the intention of advising cruisers of the risk of homophobic attacks, and any persons seen to be involved in sexual behavior will be asked to move on rather than being arrested. A number of police forces actively participate in on-line discussions with cruisers in order to gather information on hate crimes and to discourage them from using locations about which complaints have been received.

The current trend for gay cruising has been bolstered by a continued use of online media. Apps and websites including Grindr, Cruizerz.com and Squirt.org make arranged cruising possible, although this has been a source of questionable safety, with Russian gangs having been found to use such media to lure gay men into dangerous situations.

See also

Dogging
Squirt.org

References

Additional sources
 

LGBT history in England
LGBT in Wales
Casual sex
Gay history